is a Japanese shōjo fantasy romance vampire manga series written and illustrated by Aya Shouoto and published by Kodansha on Aria magazine. It is licensed in English by Yen Press, and in French by Kurokawa.

Characters
Aki Kirito
Kana Takachiho
Rie Kurumido
Jin Shiranui
Masayuki Takachiho
Dealer Swallow

References

External links

Fantasy anime and manga
Kodansha manga
Romance anime and manga
Shōjo manga
Vampires in anime and manga
Yen Press titles